NK Rudar 47 is a Croatian association football club founded in 1947 and based in the village of Donje Ladanje near Maruševec in Varaždin County. As of the 2019–20 season they compete in the Varaždin County League, 6th division in the Croatian football league system.

Association football clubs established in 1947
Football clubs in Croatia
Football clubs in Varaždin County
1947 establishments in Croatia
Mining association football teams